Orwell Site may refer to:

Orwell site (Fergus Falls, Minnesota), listed on the National Register of Historic Places in Otter Tail County, Minnesota
Orwell Site (Orwell, Vermont), listed on the National Register of Historic Places in Addison County, Vermont